Foxholes is a village in the Ryedale district of North Yorkshire, England, part of the civil parish of Foxholes with Butterwick. The course of the winterbourne stream the Gypsey Race passes to the south of the village.

Until 1974, the village lay in the historic county boundaries of the East Riding of Yorkshire.

Foxhole's Grade II listed Anglican church is dedicated to St Mary, and is an 1866 limestone and sandstone construction by George Fowler Jones Pevsner describes this neo-Norman church as: "one of the ugliest in the Riding... The north pier's are grotesque, with their undersized shafts on their over-high bases and their big square foliage capitals... Font: obstrusively Norman". He also notes several windows by Capronnier, and a 1720 cup by William Gamble.

References

External links

"Foxholes: Geographical and Historical information from the year 1892. (Bulmers')", Genuki.org.uk. Retrieved 16 April 2012

Villages in North Yorkshire
Civil parishes in North Yorkshire